Alanna Bray-Lougheed (born 24 February 1993 in Oakville, Ontario) is a Canadian sprint kayaker. She is the current Pan American Games champion in the women's K-2 500 m with Andréanne Langlois, as well as in the K-4 500 metres with Langlois, Anna Negulic, and Alexa Irvin. Bray-Lougheed was selected by the RBC Training Ground program, an elite Olympic athlete training and identification program for Canada, and joined the Canadian national team in 2015. She competed in the 2017 ICF Canoe Sprint World Championships, her first World Championships, and made the A Final in the K-2 1,000 m, finishing sixth.

In March 2021, Bray-Lougheed was named to Canada's 2020 Olympic team.

References

External links 
 Alanna Bray-Lougheed at the 2019 Pan American Games

1993 births
Living people
Canadian female canoeists
Sportspeople from Oakville, Ontario
Canoeists at the 2019 Pan American Games
Pan American Games medalists in canoeing
Pan American Games gold medalists for Canada
Medalists at the 2019 Pan American Games
Canoeists at the 2020 Summer Olympics
Olympic canoeists of Canada